The Centerville Township Bridge Number S-18 is a historic stone arch bridge on 294th Lane in rural Turner County, South Dakota, west of Centerville.  Built in 1938, it is one of a modest number of surviving stone arch bridges built in the county with funding from New Deal jobs programs.  It was listed on the National Register of Historic Places in 2000.

Description and history
It is built out of local fieldstone which is mostly granite, and has wing walls that angle outward and slope downward. The stones are joined by concrete mortar.

This bridge is one of 180 stone arch bridges built in Turner County as part of a New Deal-era federal jobs program.  The county administration was able to build stone bridges at a lower cost than then-conventional steel beam bridges because of the availability of experienced stone workers, and the federal subsidy to the wages they were paid.  The county was responsible for supervising the work crews and providing the building materials.  This bridge was built in 1938 by a county crew.

See also
National Register of Historic Places listings in Turner County, South Dakota
List of bridges on the National Register of Historic Places in South Dakota

References

National Register of Historic Places in Turner County, South Dakota
Bridges on the National Register of Historic Places in South Dakota
Bridges completed in 1938
Transportation in Turner County, South Dakota
Buildings and structures in Turner County, South Dakota